This is a list of number one singles on the Billboard Brasil Hot 100 chart in 2015.

Chart history

See also
Billboard Brasil
Crowley Broadcast Analysis

References

Brazil Hot 100
2015 Hot 100
2015 in Brazil